Sboyevskaya is a rural locality (a village) in Morozovskoye Rural Settlement, Verkhovazhsky District, Vologda Oblast, Russia. The population was 9 as of 2002.

Geography 
Sboyevskaya is located 27 km northwest of Verkhovazhye (the district's administrative centre) by road. Morozovo is the nearest rural locality.

References 

Rural localities in Verkhovazhsky District